The Sunshine Coast Region is a local government area located in the Sunshine Coast district of South East Queensland, Australia.

It was created by the amalgamation in 2008 of the City of Caloundra and the Shires of Maroochy and Noosa. It contains  of roads,  of coastline and a population of 351,424 in January 2021. The budget for the 2020–2021 financial year totals A$782 million including $243 million for Capital Works.

On 1 January 2014, the Shire of Noosa was re-established independent of the Sunshine Coast Regional council.

History 
Gubbi Gubbi (Kabi Kabi, Cabbee, Carbi, Gabi Gabi) is an Australian Aboriginal language spoken on Gubbi Gubbi country. The Gubbi Gubbi language region includes the landscape within the local government boundaries of the Sunshine Coast Region and Gympie Region, particularly the towns of Caloundra, Noosa Heads, Gympie and extending north towards Maryborough and south to Caboolture.

Prior to 2008, the new Sunshine Coast Region was an entire area of three previous and distinct local government areas:

 the City of Caloundra;
 the Shire of Maroochy;
 and the Shire of Noosa.

At the establishment of regional local government in Queensland on 11 November 1879 with the Divisional Boards Act 1879, most of the area was part of the Caboolture Division, while the northernmost part around Noosa was part of the Widgee Division centred on Gympie. The Maroochy Division split away from Caboolture on 5 July 1890. All three divisions became Shires on 31 July 1903 under the Local Authorities Act 1902.

In 1910, the Shire of Noosa split from Widgee, and on 22 February 1912 the Shire of Landsborough split from Caboolture. The two new entities together with Maroochy were to remain fairly stable for almost 100 years.

On 19 December 1987, the Shire of Landsborough was granted City status, and was renamed the City of Caloundra, reflecting the population boom in the coastal section of the City.

In July 2007, the Local Government Reform Commission released its report and recommended that the three local governments amalgamate. While it noted all three were "functioning councils with moderate to strong financial performance", it argued that they covered a self-contained region in a geographic, social and economic sense and that the advantages of coordinated planning in a high-growth area and the avoidance of duplication of facilities were arguments in favour of amalgamation. The councils opposed the amalgamation, and the Commission itself noted that the bulk of statewide individual submissions came from this region reflecting a "depth of feeling" regarding the issue. On 15 March 2008, the City and two Shires formally ceased to exist, and elections were held on the same day to elect twelve councillors and a mayor to the Regional Council.

In the 2011 census, the Sunshine Coast Region had the 4th largest population of any local government area in Australia (following City of Brisbane, City of Gold Coast and Moreton Bay Region).

In 2012, a proposal was made to de-amalgamate the Shire of Noosa from the Sunshine Coast Region. On 9 March 2013, Noosa residents voted to de-amalgamate Noosa from the Sunshine Coast Council. On 18 March 2013, the Sunshine Coast Regional Council decided its new planning scheme should not apply to those areas that were part of the former Noosa Shire (different attitudes to planning and developments having been a major objection by residents of Noosa Shire to the amalgamation). The Shire of Noosa Shire was re-established on 1 January 2014.

Divisions
The Region is divided into 10 divisions, each represented by one councillor, plus an elected mayor who represents the entire Region. The council is elected for a four-year term.

Suburbs

Population
The populations given relate to the component entities prior to 2008. The 2016 census, did not include the Shire of Noosa's census figures.

Industry

The Sunshine Coast economy is dominated by two sectors – Healthcare (including age-care) and Retail, which provide 30% of the regional employment. Other significant areas are accommodation and food services, education, construction, manufacturing and professional services. Efforts are being made to diversify the regional economy by the Sunshine Coast Regional Council.

Local educational institutions, government and community groups have funded a number of initiatives to encourage entrepreneurial and innovative businesses to the area. The University of the Sunshine Coast's Innovation Centre acts as an incubator startup companies, as does the Spark Bureau. The University site at Sippy Downs is designated as a 'Knowledge Hub' as part of the Queensland Government's South East Queensland Regional Infrastructure Plan and is master planned as Australia's first university town based on the UK models with the potential for over 6,000 workers in knowledge-based businesses. Sippy Downs was highlighted as an 'Innovation Hotspot' in July 2010, by top European Business magazine CNBC Business, with the potential to be 'Australia's no-worries-answer to Silicon Valley'.

Infrastructure

Education

The Sunshine Coast's major university is the University of the Sunshine Coast with its main campus at Sippy Downs. Central Queensland University also has a campus in Noosa. TAFE Queensland services the Sunshine Coast and Wide Bay regions through TAFE East Coast, with three Sunshine Coast campuses at Mooloolaba, Maroochydore and Nambour as well as a Noosa campus.

The Sunshine Coast has many varied denomination, private and public primary and secondary schools (see List of schools in Sunshine Coast). The Lexis English group, providing English classes to international students, has a campus in Maroochydore, while Lexis TESOL Training Centres provides teacher training programs such as the Cambridge CELTA and  TESOL.

Libraries 
The Sunshine Coast Regional Council operates libraries at Beerwah, Buddina (Kawana), Caloundra, Coolum Beach, Kenilworth, Maleny, Maroochydore and Nambour. It also operates a mobile library service visiting Beerburrum, Bli Bli, Buderim, Caloundra West (Bellvista), Conondale, Eudlo, Eumundi, Glass House Mountains, Little Mountain, Montville, Mooloolah Valley, Mooloolaba (Parkhaven), Mount Coolum, Mountain Creek, Pacific Paradise, Palmwoods, Parklands, Peachester, Pelican Waters, Peregian Springs, Sippy Downs (Chancellor Park) and Yandina.

Health
The Sunshine Coast University Hospital is the region's major hospital located in Birtinya, which opened in April 2017. The region's previous major hospital located in Nambour will be downsized and renovated, however it still operates as the coast's secondary hospital. Services remaining in Nambour General Hospital include emergency, cancer care, same-day and elective surgery, general medicine inpatient services, renal dialysis, outpatient services, medical imaging, pharmacy, diabetes services, oral health, allied health, mental health and breastcreen. There are smaller hospitals located in Caloundra and Maleny but, due to limited facilities at those hospitals, most cases are referred to the SCUH.

A number of private hospitals exist throughout the region, most notably the 'Sunshine Coast Private Hospital' at Buderim, Caloundra Private Hospital (formerly known as Andrea Ahern) at Caloundra, Selangor Hospital at Nambour, the recently established Kawana Private Hospital.

Transport

Road

The car is the predominant mode of transport for Sunshine Coast residents, with the region connected to Brisbane via the Bruce Highway. The Nicklin Way and Sunshine Motorway are the major arterial roads, which pass through most major areas of the Sunshine Coast. Many intercity and interstate coach operators also operate daily bus services to Brisbane using the major corridors.

Public transport

The Sunshine Coast is a growing region, and has  a variety of transport modes including Rail, Bus, Ferry and the Sunshine Coast Airport. However, in recent years the local council has been looking at more reliant, high quality public transport options to create a 'transport spin' on the Sunshine Coast with the Maroochydore railway line and Sunshine Coast Light Rail proposed.
Plane 

Adelaide  and Auckland with Jetstar, Virgin Australia, Qantas and Air New Zealand.

Rail 

Queensland Rail's Sunshine Coast railway line operate interurban services daily, with most trains running express between Caboolture and Bowen Hills stations. The train lines run through the Sunshine Coast Hinterland, with buses connecting to the coastal strip. Further north of the Nambour station, commuter trains operate to Gympie twice per day.

Bus 

Bus services are operated by Sunbus, which operates under the TransLink public transport system. These buses connect the suburbs and localities within the Caloundra, Maroochydore and Noosa areas. Sunshine Coast Council operates zero-fare bus services throughout the coast to surrounding suburbs and major park and ride stations during the peak summer holiday period.

Sport and recreation

Sunshine Coast Stadium is located at Kawana Waters and is home to the region's sporting teams in statewide competitions. The Sunshine Coast Falcons compete in the Queensland Cup rugby league competition while the Sunshine Coast Fire FC compete in the National Premier Leagues Queensland Football competition.  The Sunshine Coast has numerous golf links, including Headland Golf Club (Buderim), Pelican Waters, Pacific Harbour, Twin Waters, Palmer Coolum Resort (previously Hyatt Regency Coolum), Mount Coolum, Beerwah, Maleny, Cooroy, Caloundra and Maroochy River. The Sunshine Coast Regional Tennis Centre is located at Caloundra.

Media 
There are several newspapers which cover the Sunshine Coast region. Sunshine Coast Daily is published Monday to Saturday by APN News & Media. Free distribution weekly community newspapers published by APN include: Buderim Chronicle, Caloundra Weekly, Coolum & North Shore News, Kawana Weekly, Nambour Weekly, and Range News. Independent weekly newspapers include Glasshouse Country News and Hinterland Times.

While much of traditional media has an online presence there has also arisen media organisations that are exclusively online. View News is one such organisation operating a news site for the Sunshine Coast concentrating on local news from the various Sunshine Coast communities.

Sunshine Coast is served by publicly owned television services (ABC TV), (SBS) Television and three commercial television stations (Seven Queensland, WIN Television and 10), which are the regional affiliates of the Seven, Ten and Nine network stations in Brisbane. The Sunshine Coast is also in the television broadcast licence areas of Brisbane (metro), enabling most areas of the Sunshine Coast to receive the commercial Brisbane stations. Subscription television services Foxtel and Austar are also available.

All three main commercial networks produce local news coverage - Seven Queensland and WIN Television both air 30-minute local news bulletins at 6pm each weeknight. Southern Cross 10 airs short news updates of 10 News First.

Seven's bulletin is produced and broadcast from studios in Maroochydore, from where six sister local news programs for regional Queensland also originate. WIN News is also produced from a newsroom in Maroochydore, but broadcasts from studios in Wollongong.

The Sunshine Coast region is served by commercial, community and government radio stations. Commercial stations 91.9 Sea FM and 92.7 Mix FM are owned and operated by the EON Broadcasting, one of Australia's last independent broadcasters. Rival commercial operator Grant Broadcasters runs 91.1 Hot FM and Zinc96. The Government-owned ABC services the region with 90.3 ABC Coast FM and ABC NewsRadio on 94.5 FM, Triple J on 89.5 FM and ABC Classic FM on 88.7 FM. Many community access stations, as well as some Brisbane stations, can also be received.

Sunshine Coast Council

Mayors

Council

Australia Day Awards

Sister cities and Friendship cities 
As of March 2016, the Sunshine Coast Region has the following sister cities:
 Tatebayashi, Japan
 March, Fenland District, Northeast Cambridgeshire, England

As of March 2016, the Sunshine Coast Region has the following friendship cities:
 Xiamen, China
 Mont Dore, New Caledonia

References

External links

 Queensland Electoral Commission Interactive Map
 Sunshine Coast Regional Council

 
Local government areas of Queensland
2008 establishments in Australia